Beloretsk (Beloret) is a town in the Republic of Bashkortostan, Russia, located on the Belaya River,  from Ufa. Population:

History

Town-factories were a peculiar phenomenon in the town-planning in Russia in the 18th and 19th centuries. Beloretsk Iron Factory was built in 1762-1767 by merchants I. B. Tverdyshev and I. S. Myasnikov, who bought 170,041 desiatinas of land from Bashkirs of Belokatayskaya Volost. Builders and first workers of the factory were purchased serfs from Kazan, Nizhny Novgorod, Penza, and Ryazan Governorates. Beloretsk itself was founded as a factory settlement in 1762.

A Bulletin of 1776 says that the Beloretsk Iron Factory was built in 1762 and had two blast furnaces and fourteen sledge-hammers. However, the first fusion of cast iron was recorded as being done in 1767. In 1777, the factory produced more iron than any other factory in Russia. Productive capacity of the factory was 122,500 poods (~2,000 metric tons) of cast iron and 80,000 poods (~1,300 metric tons) of iron per year. There were 840 male workers at the factory.

The village of Lomovka was founded in the vicinity of Beloretsk. The name of the village came from the name of the profession of the people who lived there. They all were draymen who supplied raw materials for the factory.

One of the memorable events in the history of Beloretsk was the participation of the factory workers in the 1773-1774 rebellion under the leadership of Yemelyan Pugachev. In 1774, rebel peasants took the factory by storm and reduced it to ashes to prevent recommencement work there. The villages of Lomovka and Arskaya were also burned down. The factory was inactive for three years after that.

In the beginning of the 19th century, Beloretsk Iron Factory had two blast-furnaces and eleven Catalan forges. The factory achieved much success in the production of metal. Cast iron produced by the factory was the cheapest in the South Urals and the iron produced was known for its ductility in the cold state. In 1874, the firm "Vogau and Co." became the new owner of the factory. By the end of the 19th century, the factory received the highest award at the Russian Countrywide Exhibition at Nizhny Novgorod.

By the end of the 19th century the population of Beloretsk was 15,000. At the time, Beloretsk was a part of Orenburg Governorate. Factory workers were active participants of the revolutionary movement in the South Urals. In 1917, Beloretsk became a part of the Bashkir ASSR.

In July 1918, the Beloretsk Socialistic Regiment was formed consisting of the factory workers. The Regiment formed a part of the Urals Partisan Army under the command of Vasily Blyukher and performed a raid against the White Guard.

In 1923, Beloretsk was granted town status. By then, the population of the town, including the villages of Tirlyan and Lomovka, was 28,830. In 1930, Beloretsky District was established. At the same time, modernization of the Beloretsk Factory was started. In 1940, Beloretsk Cast Iron Melting Factory, Beloretsk Iron Factory, Tirlyan Cast Iron Melting Factory, and Tirlyan Iron Factory were merged under the name of Beloretsk Metallurgical Complex.

During World War II, thousands of people from Beloretsk participated in the battles against the Nazis. For their courage and bravery many of them received orders and medals; thirteen were awarded the title of Heroes of the Soviet Union.

In the second half of 1941, there was a problem with the production of copper wire. The only factory that could carry out military orders was Beloretsk Copper Wire and Rope Factory. Due to the wide industrial expertise, material resources and presence of Beloretsk Iron Factory, it supplied all necessary sorts of steel, and that was most important—due to the extremely intensive hard work of thousands of half-starved local people, the factory had been successfully managing its task during World War II.

After the war, Beloretsk Iron Factory was modernized, automated, and expanded. The factory then began to produce new kinds of products. In 1966, Beloretsk Iron Factory was awarded the Order of the Red Banner of Labor.

In the 1960s–1970s, residential and industrial construction was carried out on a substantial scale. A large number of social buildings consisting of more than 400 residential and industrial constructions were built in those decades. On the ground floors of the multi-storey buildings cafes, shops, libraries, social and community centers were opened. New schools and a hospital were also built.

The dissolution of the Soviet Union led to the drastic recession of industry in the 1990s. Dozens of enterprises were closed and hundreds of workers were laid off.

In 1996, Beloretsk Metallurgical Complex was re-organized as an open joint-stock company and is now known as Beloretsk Metallurgical Plant.

Administrative and municipal status
Within the framework of administrative divisions, Beloretsk serves as the administrative center of Beloretsky District, even though it is not a part of it. As an administrative division, it is incorporated separately as the town of republic significance of Beloretsk—an administrative unit with the status equal to that of the districts. As a municipal division, the town of republic significance of Beloretsk is incorporated within Beloretsky Municipal District as Beloretsk Urban Settlement.

Religion
Several religious denominations are active in Beloretsk. The biggest community of believers is the Orthodox Christians, with the Muslim community being the second largest.

Politics 
Covered by the Beloretsk constituency for elections to the State Duma.

References

Notes

Sources

External links
Official website of Beloretsk 
Beloretsk Business Directory 

Cities and towns in Bashkortostan
Populated places established in 1762